Escadron de Chasse 2/5 Île-de-France (Fighter Squadron 2/5 Île-de-France) is a French Air and Space Force (Armée de l'air et de l'espace) fighter squadron currently stationed at BA 115 Orange-Caritat Air Base  and equipped with the Dassault Mirage 2000C fighter aircraft.  The squadron's planes now carry aircraft codes between 115-OA and 115-OZ.

History 

EC 2/5 carries on the traditions of a fighter squadron created by Charles de Gaulle on November 7th, 1941 as 340 (Free French) Squadron of the Royal Air Force.  The success of this squadron during World War II earned it numerous awards and citations.

The squadron was integrated into the 5th Wing in May 1946 and the equipped with the Bell P-63 Kingcobra.  From July 1949 to January 1951, it returned to combat when deployed during the Indochina War.

In March 1951, the unit was redesignated Fighter Squadron 2/5 Ile-de-France and it moved to BA 115 Orange-Caritat and transitioned to the de Havilland Vampire.  At this point the unit's history closely follows that of the other squadron based in Orange, Escadron de Chasse 1/5 Vendée.  Both units received the same aircraft types a few months apart and were assigned to the same operational deployments one after the other.  In September 1992, EC 2/5 Ile-de-France earned the distinction of being the first unit of the French Air Force to be deployed in Saudi Arabia to enforce the no-fly zone imposed in Iraq.  It has participated in similar operations in Bosnia.

Since 1997, EC 2/5 Ile-de-France is responsible for training and operational transformation of all Mirage 2000 pilots, though its main mission remains air defense.  For this, it is equipped with 17 two-seat Mirage 2000B and 7 single-seat Mirage 2000C fighter aircraft.  

The first French female fighter pilot, Caroline Aigle, served with the squadron in 2000.

On 11 June 2010, EC 2/5 Ile-de-France and EC 1/12 Cambrai were deployed to Chad to replace the last remaining Dassault Mirage F1 aircraft of the French Air Force on the African continent.

The squadron has provided a pair of Mirage 2000C aircraft and support personnel which have been deployed to the Polish 22nd Air Base along with a pair of Mirage 2000-5 aircraft from Escadron de Chasse 1/2 Cigognes. The aircraft arrived in Poland on 2 June 2014 to relieve four French Dassault Rafales as part of NATO's response to Russian aggression in Ukraine.  They are tasked with air defense and reconnaissance in Baltic and Eastern European regions.

Citations 
 Croix de guerre 1939–1945 with five bronze palms for citations in the Order of the Day:
 4 July 1942
 30 September 1942
 12 December 1944 (No. 235)
 17 July 1945 (No. 941)
 27 December 1945 (No. 1435)
 Croix de guerre des théâtres d'opérations extérieures with four bronze palms for citations in the Order of the Day:
 23 July 1950
 2 July 1951
 21 June 1951
 10 May 1991

Flights 

 1st Flight "Paris" to June 2012, then C46 "Trident"
 2nd Flight "Vincennes" to June 2012, then SPA84 "Tete de Renard"
 3rd Flight "Versailles" from 1998 to August 2008, then SPA125 "Jeanne D'Arc"

Aircraft used 

 1942-1945:  Supermarine Spitfire (as No. 340 Squadron RAF)
 1946-1951:  Bell P-63 Kingcobra
 1951-1954:  de Havilland Vampire
 1954-1956:  SNCASE Mistral
 1957:  Dassault Mystère II
 1957-1960:  Dassault Mystère IV
 1961-1966:  Dassault Super Mystère B2
 1966-1975:  Dassault Mirage IIIC
 1975-1989:  Dassault Mirage F1C
 1989–Present:  Dassault Mirage 2000B/C

See also

 List of French Air and Space Force aircraft squadrons

References 

Fighter squadrons of the French Air and Space Force